A Fight to the Finish is a 1925 American silent drama film directed by B. Reeves Eason and starring William Fairbanks, Phyllis Haver and Tom Ricketts.

Plot
As described in a film magazine review, Jim Davis, a young man whose father has turned him out without a cent, is involved in a street fight and whips a man whom he learns is the state boxing champion in his division. Mary Corbett urges Jim to meet the champion in the ring and thereby win enough money to convince his father he can earn his own living. The ring fight is staged, but Jim loses because he has been drugged. In the dressing room after the fight, he thoroughly trounces the champion. Later he wins the affection of the young woman.

Cast
 William Fairbanks as Jim Davis 
 Phyllis Haver as Mary Corbett 
 Tom Ricketts as Cyrus J. Davis 
 Pat Harmon as Pat O'Brien 
 William Bolder as Henry McBride 
 Leon Beaumon as Battling Wilson

References

Bibliography
 Melissa Bingmann. Prep School Cowboys: Ranch Schools in the American West. UNM Press, 2015.

External links

1925 films
1925 drama films
Silent American drama films
American silent feature films
1920s English-language films
Columbia Pictures films
Films directed by B. Reeves Eason
American black-and-white films
1920s American films